Al Naft Stadium is a multi-use stadium located in Baghdad, Iraq. It is currently used mostly for football matches and serves as the home stadium of the Iraqi Premier League club Al Naft. The stadium holds 3,000 people.

See also 
List of football stadiums in Iraq

References 

Football venues in Iraq
Buildings and structures in Baghdad
Sport in Baghdad
Multi-purpose stadiums in Iraq
Football in Baghdad